Darius Crouter (May 5, 1827 – May 9, 1910) was a Canadian minister, farmer and political figure. He represented Northumberland East in the House of Commons of Canada from 1881 to 1882 as an Independent Liberal member.

He was born in Haldimand Township, Upper Canada. Crouter was a minister of the Methodist Episcopal Church, who retired to farming later in life. He was elected to the House of Commons in an 1881 by-election held following the death of Joseph Keeler. Crouter was defeated when he ran for reelection in 1882. He lived near Brighton.

References 
 
The Canadian parliamentary companion and annual register, 1882 CH Mackintosh

1827 births
1910 deaths
Members of the House of Commons of Canada from Ontario
Methodist ministers